Mirko Radovanović (born 5 April 1986 in Čačak) is a Serbian footballer.

Career statistics

External links
 Profile and stats at Srbijafudbal.
 

1986 births
Living people
Sportspeople from Čačak
Serbian footballers
Association football defenders
FK Borac Čačak players
FK Remont Čačak players
FK Mladi Radnik players
FK Mladost Lučani players
FK Radnički 1923 players
FK Smederevo players
Serbian SuperLiga players
Serbian expatriate footballers
FK Željezničar Sarajevo players
Expatriate footballers in Slovakia
Slovak Super Liga players
AS Trenčín players
Serbian expatriate sportspeople in Slovakia
Expatriate footballers in Finland
Serbian expatriate sportspeople in Finland
Ykkönen players
Oulun Palloseura players
FK Sloga Petrovac na Mlavi players